The 1992 Japanese Touring Car Championship season was the 8th edition of the series. It began at TI Circuit Aida on 15 March and finished after eight events at Fuji Speedway on 8 November. The championship was won by Masahiro Hasemi, driving for Hasemi Motorsport.

Teams & Drivers

Calendar
Overall winner in bold.

Championship Standings
Points were awarded 20, 15, 12, 10, 8, 6, 4, 3, 2, 1 to the top 10 finishers in each class, with no bonus points for pole positions or fastest laps. All scores counted towards the championship. In cases where teammates tied on points, the driver who completed the greater distance during the season was given the higher classification.

References

Touring Car Championship
Japanese Touring Car Championship seasons